Lelia Goldoni (born Lelia Vita Rizzuto; October 1, 1936) is an American actress who appeared in a number of motion pictures and television shows starting in the late 1940s, including uncredited cameo roles in Joseph L. Mankiewicz's House of Strangers (1949), John Huston's We Were Strangers (1949) and The Italian Job (1969). She appeared as Denise James in the 1965 horror film Hysteria.

She costarred on the episode "Fair Exchange" and "Two Birds with One Bullet" of the British television series Danger Man (1964) with Patrick MacGoohan.

She is best known for co-starring in John Cassavetes's groundbreaking film Shadows (1959), which launched her acting career, and for playing the best friend of Ellen Burstyn's character in Martin Scorsese's Alice Doesn't Live Here Anymore (1974).

In 2010, she appeared in the miniseries The Pacific as Dora Basilone.

Biography 
Goldoni was born Lelia Vita Rizzuto in New York City. Her father was an Italian actor and she was a second cousin to baseball player Phil Rizzuto. She attended Los Angeles City College and was part of the Lester Horton Dancers in the 1950s.

Partial filmography

References

External links

 

1936 births
Living people
Actresses from New York City
American film actresses
American television actresses
American people of Italian descent
Los Angeles City College alumni
21st-century American women